Driefontein may refer to:
 Driefontein Farm
 Driefontein, Gauteng
 Driefontein, KwaZulu-Natal
 Driefontein, North West
 Driefontein mine